The New Zealand national cricket team toured India in the 1995–96 season to play three Test matches and six ODIs. India won the 3-match Test series 1–0 and the 6-match ODI series 3–2 (3rd ODI was abandoned without a ball bowled).

The third Test was heavily affected by the 1995 India cyclone. In the lunch break of the fifth ODI, nine fans were killed when part of the stand collapsed. The teams were not told about the incident, and the match continued.
lee germin was made captain of new Zealand in his debut.

Test series

1st Test

2nd Test

3rd Test

ODI series

1st ODI

2nd ODI

3rd ODI

4th ODI

5th ODI

6th ODI

References

External links 
Series Archive at ESPN Cricinfo

Indian cricket seasons from 1970–71 to 1999–2000
International cricket competitions from 1994–95 to 1997
New Zealand cricket tours of India
1995 in Indian cricket
1995 in New Zealand cricket